Super Hits may refer to:

Super Hits (Time–Life Records), later AM Gold, a 1990s series of Top 40 compilation albums
Super Hits (Alan Jackson album), 1999
Super Hits, an album by Alice Cooper, 1999
Super Hits (Big Audio Dynamite album), 1999
Super Hits (Blood, Sweat & Tears album), 1998
Super Hits (Brooks & Dunn album), 1999
Super Hits (Charlie Daniels album), 1994
Super Hits (Cypress Hill album), 2008
Super Hits, an album by Donovan, 2000
Super Hits (Eddie Money album), 1997
Super Hits (Europe album), 1998
Super Hits (Frank Sinatra album), 2000
Super Hits (George Jones album), 1987
Super Hits (Glen Campbell album), 2000
Super Hits (Kenny Chesney album), 2007
Super Hits, an album by Lila McCann, 2002
Super Hits, an album by Lorrie Morgan, 1998
Super Hits, an album by Mandy Moore, 2007
Super Hits (Marvin Gaye album), 1970
Super Hits (Miles Davis album), 2001
Super Hits, an album by New Kids on the Block, 2001
Super Hits, an album Peabo Bryson, 2000
Super Hits (Ricky Van Shelton album), 1995
Super Hits (Shenandoah album), 1994
Super Hits, an album by Sherbet, 2006
Super Hits (Toto album), 2001
Super Hits (The Verve Pipe album), 2007
Super Hits, an album by Vince Gill, 1996
Super Hits (Wild Cherry album), 2002
Super Hits (Willie Nelson album), 1994
Super Hits (Yanni album), 2007
SuperHits 650 CISL, 2007 branding for CISL (AM)

See also 
Super Hits, Volume 2, a greatest hits album by country music artist George Jones